Hardanahalli Devegowda Revanna (born 17 December 1957) is an Indian politician from the state of Karnataka, and a member of the Legislative Assembly in the state of Karnataka, representing the Holenarasipur constituency in Hassan district. His political party is Janata Dal (Secular).

Personal life and family
He is one of the sons of former Prime Minister of India H. D. Deve Gowda and Chanamma, and is the elder brother of H. D. Kumaraswamy. He is married to Bhavani Revanna and he has two sons Suraj and Prajwal. His son, Prajwal Revanna, was elected to Lok Sabha from Hassan constituency in 2019.

Political career
He won the Holenarasipur Karnataka Legislative Assembly seat in 1994. He again contested unsuccessfully in 1999, he was elected again in the 2004 General Elections for the Karnataka Legislative Assembly from the same Constituency. This time he became Minister for PWD (Public Works Department) and Energy Department in Dharam Singh and H. D. Kumaraswamy Government. H. D. Revanna was also the president of Karnataka Milk Federation (KMF) for 9 years. In 2018 Karnataka assembly elections, HD Revanna took 92,713 votes from Holenarasipur.

Gallery

References

Living people
1957 births
People from Hassan district
Politicians from Bangalore
Children of prime ministers of India
Karnataka MLAs 1994–1999
Karnataka MLAs 2004–2007
Karnataka MLAs 2008–2013
Karnataka MLAs 2013–2018
Janata Dal (Secular) politicians
Karnataka MLAs 2018–2023